Gaussia attenuata (palma de sierra, llume) is a palm which is native to Puerto Rico.   The species grows on steep-sided limestone hills (known as mogotes) in Puerto Rico.

Description
Gaussia attenuata trees are up to 15 metres tall with grey stems which are swollen at the base and tapering above.  Stems are 15 to 25  centimetres in diameter.  Trees have five to seven pinnately compound leaves.  Fruit are orange-red, 1.4 to 1.6 cm long and 1.2 cm in diameter, with one to three seeds.

References

attenuata
Trees of Puerto Rico
Vulnerable plants
Taxa named by Odoardo Beccari